In artificial intelligence, researchers can induce the evolution of language in multi-agent systems when sufficiently capable AI agents have an incentive to cooperate on a task and the ability to exchange a set of symbols capable of serving as tokens in a generated language. Such languages can be evolved starting from a natural (human) language, or can be created ab initio. In addition, a new "interlingua" language may evolve within an AI tasked with translating between known languages.

Evolution from English 
In 2017 Facebook Artificial Intelligence Research (FAIR) trained chatbots on a corpus of English text conversations between humans playing a simple trading game involving balls, hats, and books. When programmed to experiment with English and tasked with optimizing trades, the chatbots seemed to evolve a reworked version of English to better solve their task. In some cases the exchanges seemed nonsensical:

Bob: "I can can I I everything else"
Alice: "Balls have zero to me to me to me to me to me to me to me to me to"

Facebook's Dhruv Batra said: "There was no reward to sticking to English language. Agents will drift off understandable language and invent codewords for themselves. Like if I say 'the' five times, you interpret that to mean I want five copies of this item." It's often unclear exactly why a neural network decided to produce the output that it did. Because the agents' evolved language was opaque to humans, Facebook modified the algorithm to explicitly provide an incentive to mimic humans. This modified algorithm is preferable in many contexts, even though it scores lower in effectiveness than the opaque algorithm, because clarity to humans is important in many use cases.

In The Atlantic, Adreinne LaFrance analogized the wondrous and "terrifying" evolved chatbot language to cryptophasia, the phenomenon of some twins developing a language that only the two children can understand.

Evolution ab initio 
In 2017 researchers at OpenAI demonstrated a multi-agent environment and learning methods that bring about emergence of a basic language ab initio without starting from a pre-existing language. The language consists of a stream of "ungrounded" (initially meaningless) abstract discrete symbols uttered by agents over time, which comes to evolve a defined vocabulary and syntactical constraints. One of the tokens might evolve to mean "blue-agent", another "red-landmark", and a third "goto", in which case an agent will say "goto red-landmark blue-agent" to ask the blue agent to go to the red landmark. In addition, when visible to one another, the agents could spontaneously learn nonverbal communication such as pointing, guiding, and pushing. The researchers speculated that the emergence of AI language might be analogous to the evolution of human communication.

Similarly, a 2017 study from Abhishek Das and colleagues demonstrated the emergence of language and communication in a visual question-answer context, showing that a pair of chatbots can invent a communication protocol that associates ungrounded tokens with colors and shapes.

Interlingua 
In 2016, Google deployed to Google Translate an AI designed to directly translate between any of 103 different natural languages, including pairs of languages that it had never before seen translated between. Researchers examined whether the machine learning algorithms were choosing to translate human-language sentences into a kind of "interlingua", and found that the AI was indeed encoding semantics within its structures. The researchers cited this as evidence that a new interlingua, evolved from the natural languages, exists within the network.

See also
 Artificial language
 Biocommunication (science)
 Evolutionary linguistics

References

Agent communications languages